Connecticut Farms is a neighborhood and census-designated place (CDP) within Union Township, Union County, New Jersey, United States. It was first listed as a CDP prior to the 2020 census.

The CDP is bordered by Elmwood Avenue and Stuyvesant Avenue to the north, by Rosemont Avenue, Bond Drive, and Burke Parkway to the east, by the Garden State Parkway to the south, by Chestnut Street to the southwest, and by Pennsylvania Avenue to the west. Downtown Union borders the neighborhood to the north.

U.S. Route 22 passes through the southern part of the CDP, leading east  to its terminus near Newark International Airport and southwest  to Somerville.

Demographics

References 

Census-designated places in Union County, New Jersey
Census-designated places in New Jersey
Union Township, Union County, New Jersey